"Given Up" is a song by American rock band Linkin Park. The song was released as the fourth single from their third studio album, Minutes to Midnight. It was released on February 17, 2008 in the UK as a digital download. The song was not as much of a success as what was expected in the US, although it did manage to chart high on the Alternative Songs music chart. Bennington's ability to hold a note (a fry screamed D5-B4) for 17 seconds (2:27-2:44) is considered the highlight of the song.

Background
"Given Up", along with "No More Sorrow" and the hit single "What I've Done", made its live debut on April 28, 2007 in Berlin, Germany. Live performances of these three songs at the AOL sessions were released on AOL on May 5, 2007. The performance of the song is available on the "Bleed It Out" single.

"Given Up" is one of the heaviest songs on the album. It notably features a seventeen-second-long scream by Chester Bennington before the final chorus, as well as a steady guitar riff for the choruses of the song. The scream was often split into two, eight-second long screams when performed live allowing Bennington to catch his breath, although he has completed the full scream in various live performances.

Speaking in a 2020 interview with Vulture.com, Mike Shinoda would explain how the 17-second scream came to be:

"One of our most notorious moments is this big scream on the bridge of "Given Up". I think it's a 17- or 18-second-long scream. I had organized the song, and Chester hadn't gotten familiar with the structure of the song when he was singing it. I had written a lot, or most of, those lyrics, I think, and he had just learned them; he was reading them off of a piece of paper. We got to the bridge, and he knew that he was supposed to scream "Put me out of my misery," but he didn't know how many measures that part was. So he just held the note as long as he possibly could. He was having a really good day in the studio. He had a ton of control, and he got to that point and just let it go well into the next chorus. I don't remember exactly how far. And he's like, "I don't know how long just to scream that part." I'm like, "Dude, I'm not touching that vocal. That was amazing. I'm just going to rearrange the song around what you just did.""

It starts with a distinctive jingle sound during the verses and intro, generated by the jingling of guitarist Brad Delson's ring of keys and a steady clapping beat by Mike Shinoda. The song was made available as a single on March 3, 2008.

Single release
In June 2007, the official Billboard website gave information stating that "Given Up" and "Shadow of the Day" would be the next two singles from Minutes to Midnight, following "What I've Done." This proved incorrect after "Bleed It Out" was promoted to single status, and by that time was released as a promo single between "What I've Done" and "Bleed It Out" mainly due to heavy airplay on alternative rock stations at the time. On January 24, 2008, it was announced that "Given Up" would be the band's next single after "Shadow of the Day," released on October 16, 2007. The single was released as digital download on February 17, 2008, along with a cover art.

Music video
On his official blog, Chester Bennington stated both when the video was shot and that it features live performance from the band. Bennington told the crowd at the MEN Arena and the O2 Arena during shows on January 27 and 29 that the performance of "Given Up" was recorded for use in the video, although cameras were also visible during the performance of the song at the concert on January 28 at the O2 Arena. Linkin Park had officially finished filming the video on February 6, according to Billboard Magazine. The video premiered on the band's official website on March 3, 2008 at 4pm Pacific Standard Time (Midnight UTC). The video was uploaded to the band's YouTube channel on March 4, 2008. The video was directed by Mark Fiore, the band's videographer, with additional directing credits to the band.

The video consists of live clips from the shows (stated above) and has been edited together in a sharp, rugged manner which contains short cut scenes with many special effects, mainly altering the coloring. Transitions between cut scenes are in a style of worn analog tape distortion giving the video an even more rugged, tough appearance. Bennington performs his seventeen-second scream perched on the guard rail, inches from the audience. Throughout the video, several flash scenes appear such as a cowboy, hippopotamus, an MRI of a knee, and quotes from Magical Thinking: True Stories (the "Commercial Break" chapter), a book by Augusten Burroughs.

As of December 2022, the music video for "Given Up" has over 110 million views on YouTube.

iTunes
The music video for "Given Up" is available on iTunes, along with a live concert video of the band playing the song. The live video was taken from the Road to Revolution: Live at Milton Keynes DVD.

In other media 
The song can be heard in the films Grave Encounters 2 (2012) and Red 2 (2013). The song was also used in the trailer and commercials for the 2009 film Crank: High Voltage, in which frontman Chester Bennington makes a cameo.

It is included as a master track in the Xbox 360, PlayStation 3, and Nintendo Wii versions of the music video game Rock Revolution, and as DLC for Rock Band 4, though these versions are heavily censored.

Commercial performance
On the Billboard Hot 100, "Given Up" was the least successful single of Minutes to Midnight. The single charted on Billboard's Hot 100 and Pop 100 charts at numbers 99 and 78 respectively in May 2007, following Minutes to Midnight's release.

However, on the Mainstream Rock and Modern Rock charts, it peaked higher than its follow-up, "Leave Out All the Rest". Following the single's official release, the song debuted at number 34 on the Mainstream Rock Tracks chart, peaking at number 5. It also debuted at number 32 on the Modern Rock Tracks chart, peaking at number 4.

Track listings

Release history

Charts

Certifications

References

External links
 Official band website
 [ Billboard Page, for information on the new singles and albums]
 

2007 songs
2008 singles
Linkin Park songs
Song recordings produced by Rick Rubin
Songs written by Mike Shinoda
Warner Records singles
Hardcore punk songs
American punk rock songs
American heavy metal songs